Eric Mattson is an American firefighter and politician who served as a Democratic member of the Illinois State Senate for the 43rd District from 2022 to 2023.

Career
Mattson serves as a captain in the Joliet Fire Department and is President of the Joliet Fire Officers Local 2399 union.

Mattson announced his candidacy for the 43rd District in February 2022 after incumbent John Connor announced he would not seek re-election in 2022. In May 2022, Mattson was appointed to the Illinois State Senate by local Democratic Party leaders to fill the vacancy caused by Connor's early resignation. Local news reported that Burke Schuster, Chairman of the Will County Democratic Central Committee who played a key role for the appointment, is also an officer in the Joliet Fire Department and is Vice President of the Joliet Fire Officers Local 2399.

Mattson pledged to focus on mental health resources, while primary opponent Rachel Ventura focused on environmental issues. Ventura won the Democratic nomination on June 28, 2022.

As of July 2022, Senator Mattson is a member of the following Illinois Senate committees:

 Financial Institutions Committee (SFIC)
 Healthcare Access and Availability Committee (SHAA)
 Pensions Committee (SPEN)

Electoral History

References

External links
Senator Eric Mattson at the 102nd Illinois General Assembly

Year of birth missing (living people)
Living people
People from Joliet, Illinois
American firefighters
Democratic Party Illinois state senators
21st-century American politicians